March 2022 tornado outbreak can refer to:
Tornado outbreak of March 5–7, 2022 
Tornado outbreak of March 21–23, 2022
Tornado outbreak of March 29–31, 2022